Diyan Genchev (born 8 February 1975) is a Bulgarian retired footballer. He played as a playmaker who can play well both as an attacking central midfielder.

Career
Dido as he is known among the supporters in Bulgaria, started his career in home town Varna, playing for local side Spartak.

He became one of the best midfielders in the country very soon and attracted the attention of one of the elite clubs from Sofia – Lokomotiv.

In season 2002–03 Genchev played for Kalamata FC in Greece. In June 2003 he returned to Bulgaria, signing a contract with Cherno More Varna.

In 2007–08, for six months, Genchev played in Kazakhstan Premier League for Astana.

From January 2008 he was part of the Beroe Stara Zagora team, officially joining them in February 2008. He left the team in late 2011 to join Nesebar until end of the season. After that he announced his retirement.

In the summer of 2015 he come back from retirement to join the newly joined to V Group team Inter Plachidol.

Statistic

Honours

Club
 Cherno More
Bulgarian Cup:
Runner-up: 2005–06
 Beroe
Bulgarian Cup:
Winner: 2009–10

References

External links 

Bulgarian footballers
1975 births
Living people
Association football midfielders
First Professional Football League (Bulgaria) players
PFC Spartak Varna players
FC Lokomotiv 1929 Sofia players
Kalamata F.C. players
PFC Cherno More Varna players
FC Zhenis Astana players
PFC Beroe Stara Zagora players
PFC Nesebar players
Expatriate footballers in Greece
Expatriate footballers in Kazakhstan
Bulgarian expatriate sportspeople in Kazakhstan
Sportspeople from Varna, Bulgaria